The Treaty of Rome was agreed on 27 January 1924, when Italy and the Kingdom of Serbs, Croats and Slovenes agreed that Fiume would be annexed to Italy as the Province of Fiume, and the town of Sušak would be part of the Kingdom of Serbs, Croats and Slovenes.

Fiume and Sušak would have a joint administration of the port facilities. Both towns are now in the city of Rijeka, Croatia.

Background

After Fiume was under Gabriele D'Annunzio's Italian Regency of Carnaro, the Treaty of Rapallo (1920) created the independent Free State of Fiume, which was immediately recognised by other states, including the United States, France and the United Kingdom. The state survived only one year de facto and four years de jure. The joint administration of the port was never created.

On 24 April 1921, the first general elections for its parliament occurred, and it elected President Riccardo Zanella, the leader of the Autonomist Fiuman Movement. On 3 March 1922, a movement directed by the fascist deputy Francesco Giunta forced Zanella to resign. On 17 September 1923, Gaetano Giardino, an Italian general, was sent by Italian Prime Minister Benito Mussolini with the task of restoring public order. In the meantime, negotiations started between Italy and the Kingdom of Serbs, Croats and Slovenes to dissolve the Free State of Fiume.

All parties ratified the agreement in Rome on 22 February 1924, and it became effective the same day. It was registered in the League of Nations Treaty Series on 7 April 1924.

Terms 
The Treaty of Rome revoked parts of the Treaty of Rapallo. The Kingdom of Serbs, Croats and Slovenes asserted its sovereignty over the delta of the Rječina River, including the seaport of Sušak (Porto Barros) and the north of Fiume County. Italy was given the city of Fiume, some surrounding land and a coastal corridor to connect it to the Italian mainland.

Aftermath
The exact definition of the borders were the object of a joint commission, whose results were agreed upon on 20 July 1925 in the Treaty of Nettuno.

Following the upheaval of the Second World War, Tito's Yugoslavia annexed Fiume, putting an end to the provisions of the Treaty of Rome.

Notes

External links
 Text of the treaty

Modern history of Italy
1924 in Croatia
History of Rijeka
1924 in Italy
1924 in Yugoslavia
Interwar-period treaties
Treaties concluded in 1924
Rome (1924)
Treaties of the Kingdom of Yugoslavia
Italy–Yugoslavia relations
January 1924 events
Adriatic question